Edward Robert Boddington (29 April 1862 – 4 March 1897) was a cricketer who played first-class cricket in New Zealand from 1880 to 1888.

In the seven low-scoring first-class matches played at Victory Square, Nelson, Boddington hit the highest individual score, 36, for Nelson against Wellington in March 1886, when Nelson made only 101 yet won by an innings and 46 runs.

Boddington was educated at Nelson College from 1877 to 1878, and joined the Union Bank of Australia, for whom he worked in Nelson, Wellington and Dunedin before moving to the Perth branch in 1895. He died suddenly in Perth, three months after winning the Western Australian tennis championship. He was also a prominent golfer, cyclist and athlete.

References

External links
 
 

1862 births
1897 deaths
New Zealand cricketers
Nelson cricketers
Wellington cricketers
New Zealand male tennis players
People educated at Nelson College
People from Wakefield, New Zealand